was a yojijukugo (four-character compound) phrase used as the rallying cry and slogan of a political movement in Japan in the 1850s and 1860s during the Bakumatsu period. Based on Neo-Confucianism and Japanese nativism, the movement sought to overthrow the Tokugawa shogunate and restore the power of the Emperor of Japan.

Etymology 

During the Spring and Autumn period of China, Chancellor Guan Zhong of Qi initiated a policy known as Zunwang Rangyi (尊王攘夷 ; lit. "Revere the King, Expel the Barbarians"), in reference to the Zhou kings. Adopting and adhering to it, Duke Huan of Qi assembled the Chinese feudal lords to strike down the threat of barbarians from China. For it, Confucius himself praised Guan Zhong for the preservation of Chinese civilization through the example of the contrast in the hairstyles and clothing styles between them and barbaric peoples. Through the Analects of Confucius, the Chinese expression came to be transmitted to Japan as sonnō jōi.

Philosophy 
The origin of the philosophy as used in Japan can be traced to works by 17th century Confucian scholars Yamazaki Ansai and Yamaga Sokō, who wrote on the sanctity of the Imperial House of Japan and its superiority to the ruling houses of other nations. These ideas were expanded by Kokugaku scholar Motoori Norinaga, and seen in Takenouchi Shikibu's theory of absolute loyalty to the Emperor of Japan (尊皇論 sonnōron), that implied that less loyalty should be given to the ruling Tokugawa shogunate.

Mitogaku scholar Aizawa Seishisai introduced the term sonnō jōi into modern Japanese in his work Shinron in 1825, where sonnō was regarded as the reverence expressed by the Tokugawa Shogunate to the emperor and jōi was the proscription of Christianity.

Influence

With the increasing number of incursions of foreign ships into Japanese waters in the late 18th and early 19th century, the sakoku ("national seclusion") policy came increasingly into question. The jōi "expel the barbarians" portion of sonnō jōi, changed into a reaction against the Convention of Kanagawa of 1854, which opened Japan to foreign trade. Under military threat from United States Navy Commodore Matthew C. Perry's so-called "black ships", the treaty was signed under duress and was vehemently opposed in samurai quarters. The fact that the Tokugawa Shogunate was powerless against the foreigners despite the will expressed by the Imperial court was taken as evidence by Yoshida Shōin and other anti-Tokugawa leaders that the sonnō (revere the Emperor) portion of the philosophy was not working, and that the Shogunate must be replaced by a government more able to show its loyalty to the Emperor by enforcing the Emperor’s will.

The philosophy was thus adopted as a battle cry of the rebellious regions of Chōshū Domain and Satsuma Province. The Imperial court in Kyoto sympathized with the movement. Emperor Kōmei personally agreed with such sentiments, and – breaking with centuries of imperial tradition – personally began to take an active role in matters of state: as opportunities arose, he fulminated against the treaties and attempted to interfere in the shogunal succession. His efforts culminated in March 1863 with his "Order to Expel Barbarians". Although the Shogunate had no intention of enforcing the order, it nevertheless inspired attacks against the Shogunate itself and against foreigners in Japan, the most notable incident being the killing of the trader Charles Lennox Richardson. Other attacks included the shelling of foreign shipping in Shimonoseki. Rōnins (masterless samurai) also rallied to the cause, assassinating Shogunate officials and Westerners.

This turned out to be the zenith of the sonnō jōi movement, since the Western powers responded by demanding reparations for the assassinations and other acts by samurai against Western interests. In 1864, four Western nations launched a campaign against Shimonoseki, overrunning the meager defences and briefly occupying the region. While this incident showed that Japan was no match for Western military powers, it also served to further weaken the Shogunate, permitting the rebel provinces to ally and overthrow it, bringing about the Meiji Restoration.

The slogan itself was never actually a government or rebel policy; for all its rhetoric, Satsuma in particular had close ties with the West, purchasing guns, artillery, ships and other technology.

Legacy
After the symbolic restoration of Emperor Meiji, the sonnō jōi slogan was replaced with fukoku kyōhei (富国強兵), or "enrich the nation, strengthen the armies", the rallying call of the Meiji period and the seed of its actions during World War II.

See also
This phrase is featured and examined in James Clavell's Gai-Jin: A Novel of Japan
Shishi
Shōwa Restoration

Notes

References
 Akamatsu, Paul. (1972). Meiji 1868: Revolution and Counter-Revolution in Japan (Miriam Kochan, translator). New York: Harper & Row.
 Beasley, William G. (1972). The Meiji Restoration. Stanford: Stanford University Press.
 Craig, Albert M. (1961). Chōshū in the Meiji Restoration. Cambridge: Harvard University Press.
 Jansen, Marius B. and Gilbert Rozman, eds. (1986). Japan in Transition: from Tokugawa to Meiji. Princeton: Princeton University Press. ;  OCLC 12311985
  Jansen, Marius B. (2000). The Making of Modern Japan. Cambridge: Harvard University Press. ;  OCLC 44090600
Shiba, Ryotaro. (1998). The Last Shogun: The Life of Tokugawa Yoshinobu. Tokyo: Kodansha. 

Japanese historical terms
Meiji Restoration
Political catchphrases
Xenophobia in Asia
Japanese nationalism